Barareh Nights is a 2005 Iranian satire television series broadcast by the IRIB network. The series ended after 92 episodes; the storyline of Barareh Nights was not complete. It aired in Iran daily at 8:00 p.m. Tehran time on Channel 3. Rebroadcast outside of the country was daily on IRIB 1 and IRIB 2. The last show episode aired Thursday 1 December 2005. It was directed by Mehran Modiri.

Barareh Nights is the prequel to Mehran Modiri's 2002 serial, Pavarchin. Whilst not taking place in Barareh, Pavarchin introduced the oddities and strange behaviours of Barareans. The series also has many of the cast members from Modiri's earlier works such as Pavarchin, Noghtechin, and Jayezeye Bozorg.

Plot outline
The show is set in the fictional village of Barareh in Iran of the 1930s, about a journalist in the name of kianoosh estegrar zade, during the reign of Reza Shah Pahlavi, whose picture can be seen on the set. The village people have their own Persian dialect which humorously modifies the language. In addition to this, the Barareans also have certain customs and rituals which at times are comical, such as their method of eating chick peas—by slapping individual peas from palm into mouth. The village of Barareh is believed by many be a microcosm of Iran. The town is split along the lines of Upper and Lower Barareh, which allegedly mimics the difference between the classes in modern-day Iran. Events in the village, such as football ("darbid") matches, village council elections and marriage closely mirror today's Iran.

The show stars Mehran Modiri, as Shir Farhad, the son of Lower Barareh's khan, or leader. He lives with his sister, Saharnaz(Shaghayegh Dehghan); mother, Shadoneh(Falamak Joneidi); and father, Salar Khan. The show begins when a journalist, Kiyanoosh(Siamak Ansari), from Tehran is arrested for writing an article criticizing the government, escapes capture, and then is bitten by a snake. Shir Farhad finds him collapsed and brings him to the village of Barareh, nurtures him to health, and gradually introduces him to the town and the other characters in the show, such as the families of Upper and Lower Barareh's Khans, as well as the flamboyant village poet, Bagoori, and village doctor. Later in the series, new characters such as the village gendarme and Upper Barareh's Khan's son and daughter, Keivoon (Reza Shafiei Jam) and Leiloon (Behnoosh Bakhtiari), join the cast. Davooneh doesn't appear in this.

Cast

 Lower Barrareh
Mehran Modiri - Shir Farhad Barareh (the Lower Barareh Khan's son, but later he becomes the son-in-law of the Khan of Upper Barareh).
Siamak Ansari - Kiyanoosh Barareh (A journalist that is committed to jail because of political event, but he later becomes the husband of Saharnaz Barareh, which makes him the son-in-law of the Khan of Lower Barareh) 
Shaghayegh Dehghan - Saharnaz Barareh (the Lower Barareh Khan's daughter)
Mohammad Shiri - Salar Khan Barareh (the Khan of Lower Barareh)
Falamak Joneidi - Shadoneh Khanoum Barareh (the Lower Barareh Khan's wife)
Hassan Shokohi - Babri Khan Barareh (Brother of Shadoneh)

 Upper Barrareh
Saeid Pirdoost - Sardar Khan Barareh (the Khan of Upper Barareh)
Fatemeh Hashemi - Shakheh Shemshad Khanoum Barareh (the Upper Barareh Khan's wife)
Behnoosh Bakhtiari - Leiloon Barareh (the Upper Barareh Khan's daughter)
Reza Shafiei Jam - Keivoon Barareh (the Upper Barareh Khan's son)
Saed Hedayati - Jan Nesar Barareh (the Upper Barareh Khan's quasi-servant, whose sole purpose is to compliment and cajole him)
Hadi Kazemi - Nezam Do Barareh (Barareh's Gandarmerie assistant and the son of the khan of Bararieh)
Hossein Rahmani Manesh
 Other characters
Mohammad-Reza Hedayati - Yavar Toghrol (Barareh's Gandarmerie)
Mokhtar Saegi - Corporal (Corporal for the Gandarmerie of Barareh)
Ali Kazemi - Bagoori (the poet of Barareh )
Ali asghar Heidari karimzadeh - Dr. Jakool (Village doctor/barber/banker/dentist)
Shayan Ahadifar - Village Jester

 Imaginary characters
Khorzookhan

References

External links
  
"TV comedy raises tough issues in Iran" — article from Reuters.

Iranian comedy television series
2000s Iranian television series
2005 Iranian television series debuts
2006 Iranian television series endings
Islamic Republic of Iran Broadcasting original programming
Persian-language television shows